Eky Taufik Febriyanto (born on 15 February 1992) is an Indonesian professional footballer who plays as a full-back for Liga 1 club Persis Solo.

Club career

Persela Lamongan
In 2011, Eky signed with Persela Lamongan for 2011–12 Indonesia Super League, At the junior level, Eky was the captain of Persela U21 which won the title for two consecutive seasons at 2010–11 ISL U21 and 2012 ISL U21. Eky is a fairly loyal player while joining the team, a decade of strengthening Persela, he admits that there are many unforgettable moments, he is a team with many Persela legend players. One of the most memorable things he said was when he played with Persela legend, Choirul Huda.

On 30 April 2021, a decade more strengthening Persela, Eky officially resigned from the team this season, the certainty was obtained from his post on his personal Instagram account on Friday, While he had a good season in his first year with 117 appearances and two goals.

Persis Solo
On 6 May 2021, Eky signed a contract with Indonesian Liga 2 club Persis Solo, he officially became a part of the Sambernyawa Warriors (the nickname of Persis Solo) to navigate 2021–22 season. He made his league debut on 26 September by starting in a 2–0 win against PSG Pati, and he also scored his first goal for Persis in the 22nd minute.

Bali United (loan)
In January 2022, Eky signed a contract with Liga 1 club Bali United on loan from Persis Solo. Eky made his league debut in a 1–0 win against Persib Bandung on 13 January 2022 as a substitute for I Made Andhika Wijaya in the 79th minute at the Ngurah Rai Stadium, Denpasar.

Honours

Club
Persela Lamongan U-21
 Indonesia Super League U-21: 2010–11, 2012
Persis Solo
 Liga 2: 2021
Bali United
 Liga 1: 2021–22

Individual
 Liga 2 Best XI: 2021

References

External links
 Eky Taufik Febriyanto at Soccerway
 Eky Taufik Febriyanto at Liga Indonesia

1991 births
Living people
Indonesian footballers
Liga 1 (Indonesia) players
Liga 2 (Indonesia) players
Persela Lamongan players
Persis Solo players
Bali United F.C. players
Indonesia youth international footballers
Association football defenders
People from Sragen Regency
Sportspeople from Central Java